Andrew Paterson (29 September 1877 – 15 December 1948) was an internationally renowned and multi-award winning Scottish portrait photographer whose services were sought over several decades by many leading political and commercial figures.

Life and career 

Andrew Paterson was born at 18 Shoe Lane in Merkinch, Inverness on 29 September 1877. His father, James Paterson, was a ship's captain in the merchant marine who drowned in the Moray Firth when Andrew was two years old. Paterson learned the art of taking photographs locally but gained further experience in Edinburgh before returning to Inverness, becoming apprenticed to photographers Emery & MacGillivray of Bridge Street. In 1897, at age 20, Andrew Paterson opened his own photographic business at 32 Church Street. Between 1900 and 1902 he was located at 3 New Market Entry, and in 1903 the studio moved to 15 Academy Street (later numbered as 19 Academy Street in 1905), where it would remain until 1980. Paterson had a fine conception of the art of photography, keeping himself up to date with its scientific progress; the specimens he produced won much praise at exhibitions not only in the Highlands and the south but also abroad, where he was awarded many distinctions. He built up a fine collection of photographic studies of people distinguished in literature, politics, theatre, science and industry.

He was a frequent exhibitor at the Royal Photographic Society in London, and details of his entries can be found in the catalogue records of the annual exhibitions of the Society (1870-1915). By 1912, Paterson was also experimenting with moving film, producing one of the earliest cinematic films in Scotland. Mairi: The Romance of a Highland Maiden was a silent black and white film, which ran just over 17 minutes. It was first shown to the public in the Central Hall Picture House, Academy Street, Inverness, on 29 June 1913. Andrew Paterson was the founder of the Camerons' Comforts Fund during the First World War. It was on his initiative that the fund was set up, and personally undertook the task of packing parcels, night after night until the early hours of the morning, for the men serving in the different Battalions of The Queen's Own Cameron Highlanders. Paterson was heavily involved with the local amateur dramatic scene and under his management Rob Roy was produced at the Theatre Royal Inverness in 1915, by a company of over 50 performers. He also acted in the production as Captain Thornton and was eventually responsible for several productions of this play over the years.

In May 1935, the Daily Record, which was the Official Organ of the Scottish Photographic Federation, utilised the talent of Andrew Paterson. Writing that his "name is known wherever the camera is regarded as a serious medium of expression in portraiture," Paterson was brought to the photographic studios of the Daily Record in order to collaborate with their own regular staff and "provide that inspirational note that keeps the newspaper picture pages continually fresh and interesting." It also offered "to make arrangements with prominent citizens who would like to take advantage of Mr Andrew Paterson's presence in Glasgow, to secure a portrait by his always individual hand." One particular technique Paterson used to great effect was virtually new at the time - the soft focus lens, coupled with subtle lighting effects. The soft focus effect is used in glamour photography because the effect eliminates blemishes and, in general, produces a dream-like image. Many think of these lenses as merely a way to 'erase wrinkles,' and although very flattering for portraiture, during the late 19th and early 20th centuries, soft focus lenses were popular for a number of subjects. A group that called themselves 'Pictorialists' used them on a wide range of subject matter. They were contemporaries of the Impressionist movement, and the soft focus lenses created a similar feeling in photographs. Paterson married Jean MacKenzie MacLennan in the Station Hotel, Inverness, in March 1901 and they had three children, a daughter Constance and twin boys Hector and Hamish. Paterson outlived his wife by six months and died on the afternoon of 15 December 1948, aged 72 years, at his home Tigh-an-Uillt in Culduthel Road, Inverness. The studio business was carried on by his son Hector G.N. Paterson until his own retirement in 1980.

Works 

Andrew Paterson became an internationally famous, multi-award winning portrait photographer, whose services were sought over several decades by many leading political and commercial figures of the day. But like any business, it was 'bread-and-butter' work which kept the studio busy, including commissions for portraits of local family groups, weddings, babies, local businessmen, clergy and stage actors.

Some of his most famous sitters included Prime Ministers Lloyd George and Ramsay MacDonald, theatrical artistes John Gielgud, Noël Coward and Anna Neagle, the Czech statesman Jan Masaryk and the painter Sir William Russell Flint.

In December 1929 a portrait study of Compton Mackenzie at the Scottish National Salon was specially commended by the critics. A gelatine silver print of the portrait (signed and dated by Mackenzie in 1931), was bought by the National Portrait Gallery in London from Bonhams in March 2011 for £600. In January 1931 his portraits of William Mackay Mackenzie, Reverend Professor John Macleod and James Maxton, MP, were on display in the pictorial section at the Foundation Exhibition of the Scottish National Gallery and Museum of Photography in Edinburgh, where Paterson was congratulated on the excellence of his work. He built up a remarkably fine collection of photographic studies of people distinguished in all walks of life, and when the first Scottish PEN Conference was held in Edinburgh in 1927, it featured his gallery of famous literary personages, including George Bernard Shaw, Hilaire Belloc and many others with worldwide reputations. Others that sat for him include Clementine Hozier (the future Mrs Winston Churchill), Lord Lovat, Neil M. Gunn, Sir John Barbirolli, Robert Bellew Adams, John Murray (theologian), Osgood Mackenzie, Clement Attlee, Margery Lawrence, William Forgan Smith (premier of Queensland), Cunninghame Graham, Mark Hambourg, Sir David Young Cameron, Matheson Lang, Hutin Britton, Hugh Dalton, Eric Linklater, Joe Corrie, Hannen Swaffer, and Gordon Bottomley.

Awards 

Paterson won in total 23 awards and diplomas, both national and international, for his work and gave many exhibitions both at home and abroad. In 1935 the Glasgow Daily Record noted that "his portraits...have been regarded as setting new standards of excellence in the expression of character. He was one of those who helped to elevate portrait photography into an art form equalling that of an oil painting." His highest honours for portraiture included The Salon, Royal Photographic Society London, Paris 1902, Paris 1903, Brussels, Glasgow, Dundee, Bolton, Croydon, Southampton, Southsea, Frome, Hove, Wigan (two awards), Newbury, Nottingham, Scottish National Edinburgh 1908, Scottish National Glasgow 1911, Edinburgh Photographic Society 1920. The award from the Edinburgh Photographic Society was for the portrait of James Barron, proprietor of The Inverness Courier who had died the previous year. Paterson was the only Scottish photographer to gain such a distinction in the annual EPS open exhibition of 1920.

Mairi silent film 

Believed to be one of the earliest narrative films made in Scotland, and almost certainly the first to be made in the Highlands, Andrew Paterson used the natural setting of the coast at North Kessock to make a silent movie involving smugglers, which premiered in the Central Hall Picture House, Academy Street, Inverness, on 29 June 1913. In 1912 one of the Gaumont area salesmen selling photographic equipment persuaded Paterson to buy a cine camera. Paterson was much involved with amateur theatricals in Inverness at the time and decided to experiment with the new medium.

During the spring the storyline was written by Paterson and his wife Jenny. Paterson owned a holiday cottage in North Kessock where the family stayed each summer, so locations were chosen close by in order to facilitate transport of the camera, equipment and cast. Locations include the shoreline east of the present Kessock Bridge at Kilmuir, below Croft Downie (ex-Craigton Cottage), and possibly an exterior scene filmed at Kessock House.

Mairi: The Romance of a Highland Maiden, his silent, black and white film, runs just over 17 minutes and is the dramatised account of Mairi, a young girl in love with a Revenue Officer, who is caught up in a fight to catch smugglers. It is one of the few purely indigenous fiction films of the time and while presenting well the beaches and cliffs of North Kessock, the romance and smuggling story is inconsequential. In 1953 the film was re-edited by James Nairn, who added a written introduction, intertitles and credits. This is the version that has since been preserved, and it was shown again in June 1983 and November 2012 at the Eden Court Theatre in Inverness. It is possible this existing print is much shorter than the original. Paterson's synopsis has several scenes before the current print begins. Whether they were ever filmed or not, or have been lost or destroyed is unknown.
 
Written, produced, directed and filmed by Andrew Paterson, the cast included local amateur thespians Evelyn Duguid as Mairi, Tom Snowie as Bates, Dan Munro, Jack Maguire, Dan Dallas, Alex Paterson, Hector McIver and Luis Lyon.

The story involves Highland whisky smuggler Lovat MacDonald, whose daughter Mairi is in love with Revenue Officer Bates. Alpine, one of the smugglers, is also in love with Mairi and swears revenge. The Revenue Officers follow the smugglers to their cave hideout, and a fight ensues in which Bates is dashed down to the rocks below. Mairi sees Alpine watching over the still form of her lover and seeks help, whereupon Bates recovers. The other smugglers are smoked out of the cave. At the end Mairi reconciles Alpine with Bates, and everyone lives happily ever after.
The scene where the two men are fighting on a cliff top, before Bates is exchanged for a dummy and thrown over the edge, is a nice example of early special effects, and the film stands in comparison with most of the professionally made films at that time. It was a considerable achievement for a photographer and cast without any film experience. As a portrait photographer, it would have seemed logical for Paterson to feature a substantial amount of facial close-ups in the film, a trait of the silent movies where close-ups were used to display emotion, but there are none in the film at all. Leading man Tom Snowie, a cabinet maker also heavily involved in the local dramatic scene, eventually went on to play Rob Roy for many years. Tall, of fine physique and commanding presence, Snowie made an imposing Rob Roy in his Highland garb. He was later a manager of the old Central Hall Picture House but never mentioned his participation in the film during his lifetime.

Evelyn Duguid, who played the title role of Mairi in the film, also featured in the 1915 stage production of Rob Roy, playing Diana Vernon. In 1920 she married a Canadian barrister, Winfred Withrow and emigrated to Nova Scotia. She is remembered there as a vital, enthusiastic woman, with a passion for all things Scottish, and described as "the spirit and life of the Celtic Society," encouraging people to learn Scottish dances and songs. She also stayed involved with local amateur dramatics. Paterson later made two short documentary films of Scottish scenery on behalf of the old Highland Railway Company, taken from the footplate of one of their railway engines. Unfortunately, he made no further films because he was not that impressed by the new moving picture technique.

When interviewed for the Glasgow Herald in June 1983, his son Hector G.N. Paterson said: "The story of Mairi was written by my father and my mother in 1912 and filmed on the rocks and shore of North Kessock, on the Moray Firth. My father bought a cine camera from Gaumont Graphic, and after a short period he decided he was wasting his time going out and doing cine work, and he asked the Gaumont Graphic people to take the camera back, which they did with regret, but my father insisted that portrait photography for him was much more important."

Camerons' Comforts Fund 

Andrew Paterson was the founder of the Camerons' Comforts Fund during the First World War. It was on his initiative that the fund was set up, and personally undertook the task of packing parcels, night after night until the early hours of the morning, for the men serving in the different Battalions of The Queen's Own Cameron Highlanders. He also organised the Camerons' Fair, a remarkable effort which, with only six weeks' preparation, raised over £4,000 for the Fund.

After the war he continued to take an interest in the welfare of the men who had served with the Camerons and was one of two trustees charged with the administration of the residue of the Fund. Because of his input, many deserving old Camerons whose claims were outside the scope of Regimental and British Legion funds were assisted in times of financial adversity. In 1918 Paterson commissioned his friend, the artist Joseph Gray, who had fought with the 4th (Dundee) Battalion, The Black Watch Regiment during the war, to paint two war pictures, one of the 4th Seaforths and the other of the 6th Camerons at the Battle of Loos. In 1954 his daughter gifted the paintings on permanent loan to the Cameron Highlanders for the Depot at Inverness. They can now both be seen on display at The Highlanders' Museum in Fort George. At the beginning of the Second World War, Paterson was instrumental in the re-formation of the Camerons' Comforts Fund.

Rob Roy theatre productions 

Stage productions by the Inverness Amateur Dramatic Society were a highlight of the cultural calendar in Inverness in the 1920s and 1930s, and Andrew Paterson interested himself in these locally produced theatricals, even ably playing the part of Captain Thornton in stage versions of Rob Roy.

The performances, which raised money for various charities, were often held in the Central Hall Picture House, and many of the performers gathered in the Paterson studio to pose for publicity and promotional pictures. It was from this group of friends that he was able to cast his 1912 film, Mairi: The Romance of a Highland Maiden.

The film's leading man, Tom Snowie played Rob Roy for many years in several Andrew Paterson-produced versions of the play, and the cast usually included several notable local characters. Alexander Dallas's performance as Baillie Nicol Jarvie was often acknowledged as a highlight, as was that of Donald Dallas (also a Mairi participant) as Dougal Cratur. "A perpetual source of amusement," reported The Inverness Courier of the 1922 performance of Rob Roy.

The 1915 production had also featured Mairi leading lady Evelyn Duguid as Diana Vernon (with her sister Jean as Helen MacGregor). It was presented at the Theatre Royal Inverness by a company of over 50 performers under the management of Paterson.

In 1932 the Sir Walter Scott centenary was celebrated with a production of Rob Roy, once again featuring Tom Snowie, Donald Dallas and Paterson, with Carrie Cruickshank as Diana Vernon. One reviewer wrote "Inverness has seen many fine performances of this production, but we doubt if there has been such a satisfying one, or if it has been presented so completely as it was last night...Mr Tom Snowie, who is thoroughly familiar with the part of Rob Roy, gave a strong and forcible impersonation of that character, and Mr Donald Dallas as Dougal always delighted the audience with his pungent manner of expression and fearless and defiant gestures...Much credit is due to the producer, Mr Andrew Paterson, and the stage manager, Mr Tom Snowie, for the success of the performance."

Scottish Highlander Photo Archive 

Between 1897 and 1980 the Andrew Paterson Studio accumulated well over 100,000 glass plate and film negatives, but they disappeared from the scene after Hector Paterson, who was initially going to destroy them, sold the archive to the German photographer Andreas von Einsiedel, who required two vans to take them away. "The irony is that the only important Andrew Paterson work left in Scotland is that film which he made in 1912," wrote reporter Joe Mulholland in the Glasgow Herald in 1983.

In the late 1990s the archive resurfaced but it was broken up in 2001, with many scenic and military images being dispersed to other collections. The remaining bulk of the archive, consisting mostly of the portrait legacy of Andrew Paterson, was once again saved from destruction by Adrian Harvey and Fergus Weir and put into deep storage until 2008, when they founded the Scottish Highlander Photo Archive to preserve the images, with the added intention of uploading them online for use by genealogists and family history researchers. Negatives, prints and other related ephemera were returned to the collection and made available online.

References

External links 
http://www.patersoncollection.co.uk
http://www.scottishhighlanderphotoarchive.co.uk

1877 births
1948 deaths
Scottish photographers
People from Inverness